Carposina crypsichola is a moth in the Carposinidae family. It is found on Sumatra.

References

Natural History Museum Lepidoptera generic names catalog

Carposinidae
Moths of Indonesia
Moths described in 1910